Stricken Peninsula is a 1945 propaganda film made by the Army Film Unit and the British Ministry of Information for the Department of Psychological Warfare to highlight the British Army's reconstruction work in southern Italy in the immediate aftermath of World War II. The film was directed by Paul Fletcher and was narrated by William Holt. A contemporaneous review of the film by the Documentary News Letter (DNL) praised it as "salutary and excellent. The realities of the war's aftermath presented with considerable artistry".

A score for the film was composed by the British composer Ralph Vaughan Williams, but it is now lost. A reconstructed score arranged by Phillip Lane and performed by the BBC Symphony Orchestra was broadcast on BBC Radio 3 in March 2016. The DNL reserved their criticism for Vaughan Williams's score feeling that it was "execrable" and that "One is conscious only of obtrusive and disagreeable noise intruding between the audience and a moving story". This was the last of the British propaganda films that Vaughan Williams scored. Jeffrey Richard in his 1997 book Films and National British Identity wrote that Vaughan Williams's score could "stand on its own" as "an atmospheric and economical but musically sophisticated and multi-layered evocation of the various facets of post-war reconstruction".

References

External links

1945 documentary films
1945 compositions
1945 films
1945 in Italy
British black-and-white films
British documentary films
British Army in World War II
British World War II propaganda films
Films scored by Ralph Vaughan Williams
Italy in World War II